Michael Leach (16 January 1947 – 11 January 1992) was a footballer with Queens Park Rangers in the 1960s and 1970s.

He made over 300 Football League appearances for QPR. His first league appearance for them was in 1964–65, and his final league game with QPR was in 1977–78. His final appearance was in a 3rd round F.A. Cup tie versus Wealdstone on 7 January 1978 played at Loftus Road.

In 1978, he moved to the USA to play in the North American Soccer League with the Detroit Express, making 23 appearances for them.

He died from cancer in 1992.

References

Queens Park Rangers F.C. players
1947 births
1992 deaths
Footballers from Hackney Central
Detroit Express players
Cambridge United F.C. players
English Football League players
North American Soccer League (1968–1984) players
Deaths from cancer
Association football midfielders
English footballers
English expatriate sportspeople in the United States
Expatriate soccer players in the United States
English expatriate footballers